Julian Rowe (born 25 May 1985) is an Australian rules footballer with the Old Carey Football Club in the Victorian Amateur Football League, formerly with the AFL's Collingwood Football Club.

Originally from Old Carey, the youngster was considered a 'surprise pick' in the 2003 AFL Draft by Collingwood coach Mick Malthouse because Rowe was still available at No. 60 overall. He made his senior debut mid-season and showed potential of becoming a long-term midfielder/half-forward, having a good debut season, playing 8 games. In 2005 he started with a string of games, becoming a regular, before being dropped despite lifting his form. He managed only 2 games in 2006 and was delisted at the end of the season.

Rowe joined Port Melbourne in 2007, along with the other Magpies Brayden Shaw and David Fanning.
He has now gone back to his original club Old Carey which plays in the Premier section of the VAFA.

External links
Julian Rowe at the Collingwood Football Club website 

1985 births
Collingwood Football Club players
Port Melbourne Football Club players
Living people
Australian rules footballers from Victoria (Australia)
Oakleigh Chargers players
People educated at Carey Baptist Grammar School